Niskanen is a Finnish surname. Notable people with the surname include:

 Esko Niskanen (1928–2013), Finnish politician
 Heikki Niskanen (1896–1962), Finnish farmer and politician
 Henrik Niskanen (1873–1951), Finnish farmer and politician
 Hugo Niskanen (1920–2014), Finnish long-distance runner
 Iivo Niskanen (born 1992), Finnish cross-country skier
 Inka Niskanen (born 1974), Finnish air force officer
 Ilmari Niskanen (born 1997), Finnish professional footballer
 Jyrki Niskanen (born 1956), Finnish opera singer
 Kerttu Niskanen (born 1988), Finnish cross-country skier
 Matt Niskanen (born 1986), American ice hockey player
 Mika Niskanen (born 1973), Finnish ice hockey player
 Mikko Niskanen (1929–1990), Finnish film director
 Tanja Niskanen (born 1992), Finnish ice hockey player
 Ville Niskanen (1887–1970), Finnish diplomat
 William A. Niskanen (1933–2011), American economist, after whom the Niskanen Center is named

See also

 Niskanen Center, Washington, D.C.-based think tank

Finnish-language surnames